The Bread and Roses Award for Radical Publishing is a British literary award presented for the best radical book published each year, with radical book defined as one that is "informed by socialist, anarchist, environmental, feminist and anti-racist concerns" – in other words, ideologically left books. The award believes itself to be the UK's only left-wing only book prize. Books must be written, or largely written by authors or editors normally living in the UK, or international books available for purchase in the UK. Winning authors receive . The Bread and Roses Award is sponsored by the Alliance of Radical Booksellers and has no corporate sponsorship.

Bread and Roses is a phrase from the Bread and Roses strike of 1912 among textile workers in Lawrence, Massachusetts. In a song – "Bread and Roses" – commemorating the event, the strikers supposedly struck "for bread, and for roses too."

The inaugural prize was announced 1 May 2012, on International Workers Day, at the Bread and Roses pub in Clapham, London.

Winners and shortlists
2012  David Graeber, Debt: The First 5,000 Years
Tim Gee, Counterpower: Making Change Happen
Nadia Idle and Alex Nunns (editors), Tweets from Tahrir: Egypt’s Revolution as it Unfolded, in the Words of the People Who Made It
Owen Jones, Chavs: The Demonization of the Working Class
Andy Merrifield, Magical Marxism
Laurie Penny, Penny Red: Notes from the New Age of Dissent
Nicholas Shaxson, Treasure Islands: Tax Havens and the Men who Stole the World
2013  Hsiao-Hung Pai, Scattered Sand: The Story of China's Rural Migrants
Federico Campagna and Emanuele Campiglio (editors), What We Are Fighting For: A Radical Collective Manifesto
Danny Dorling, No-Nonsense Guide to Equality
Donny Gluckstein, A People's History of the Second World War: Resistance Versus Empire
Eveline Lubbers, Secret Manoeuvres in the Dark: Corporate and Police Spying on Activists
Paul Mason, Why It's Still Kicking Off Everywhere: The New Global Revolutions
Daniel Poyner (editor), Autonomy: The cover designs of Anarchy 1961–1970
Dan Swain, Alienation: An Introduction to Marx’s Theory
2014  Joe Glenton, Soldier Box: Why I Won’t Return to the War on Terror
Rob Evans and Paul Lewis, Undercover: The True Story of Britain's Secret Police
Oscar Guardiola-Rivera, Story of a Death Foretold: The Coup against Salvador Allende, 11 September 1973
Barry Kushner and Saville Kushner, Who Needs the Cuts?: Myths of the Economic Crisis
Katharine Quarmby, No Place to Call Home: Inside the Real Lives of Gypsies and Travellers
Andrew Simms, Cancel the Apocalypse: The New Path to Prosperity
Imogen Tyler, Revolting Subjects: Social Abjection and Resistance in Neoliberal Britain
2015  Helena Earnshaw and Angharad Penrhyn Jones, Here We Stand: Women Changing The World
 Ha-Joon Chang, Economics: The User’s Guide
 Malu Halasa, Zaher Omareen and Nawara Mahfoud, Syria Speaks: Art and Culture from the Frontline
 Tansy E. Hoskins, Stitched Up: The Anti-Capitalist Book of Fashion
 Francesca Martinez, What the **** is Normal?!
 James Meek, Private Island: Why Britain Now Belongs to Someone Else
 Lara Pawson, In the Name of the People: Angola’s Forgotten Massacre
2016  Jeremy Seabrook, The Song of the Shirt: The High Price of Cheap Garments, from Blackburn to Bangladesh
 Phil Chamberlain and Dave Smith, Blacklisted: The Secret War Between Big Business and Union Activists 
 Kate Evans, Red Rosa: A Graphic Biography of Rosa Luxemburg
 Mel Evans, Artwash: Big Oil and the Arts
 Rhian E. Jones, Petticoat Heroes: Gender, Culture and Popular Protest in the Rebecca Riots
 Katrine Marçal, Who Cooked Adam Smith’s Dinner? A Story About Women and Economics
2017  Alex Nunns, The Candidate: Jeremy Corbyn’s Improbable Path to Power
 Dawn Foster, Lean Out
 Andrea Needham, The Hammer Blow: How 10 Women Disarmed a War Plane
 Lara Pawson, This is the Place to Be
 See Red Members & Sheila Rowbotham, See Red Women’s Workshop – Feminist Posters 1974-1990
 Jack Shenker, The Egyptians: A Radical Story
 Gary Younge, Another Day in the Death of America
2018  Stuart Hall, Familiar Stranger: A Life Between Two Islands (with Bill Schwarz) (joint winner)
 Reni Eddo-Lodge, Why I’m No Longer Talking to White People About Race (joint winner)
 Kapka Kassabova, Border: A Journey To The Edge Of Europe
 Heather McDaid (Editor), Laura Jones (Editor), Nasty Women
 Vickie Cooper, David Whyte (editors), The Violence of Austerity
 Dave Randall, Sound System: The Political Power of Music
2019  Liz Fekete, Europe's Fault Lines: Racism and the Rise of the Right
 Akala, Natives: Race and Class in the Ruins of Empire
 June Eric-Udorie (Editor), Can We All Be Feminists?: Seventeen writers on intersectionality, identity and finding the right way forward for feminism
 Juno Mac and Molly Smith, Revolting Prostitutes: The Fight for Sex Workers' Rights
 Daniel Trilling, Lights In The Distance:  Exile and Refuge at the Borders of Europe
 Mike Wendling, Alt Right: From 4chan to the White House
2020  Johny Pitts, Afropean: Notes from Black Europe
 Frances Ryan, Crippled: Austerity and the Demonization of Disabled People
 Becky Alexis-Martin, Disarming Doomsday: The Human Impact of Nuclear Weapons since Hiroshima
 Ruth Kinna, The Government of No One: The Theory and Practice of Anarchism
 Priyamvada Gopal, Insurgent Empire: Anticolonial Resistance and British Dissent
 Kate Charlesworth, Sensible Footwear: A Girl’s Guide. A graphic guide to lesbian and queer history 1950-2020
2021  Ellen Clifford, The War on Disabled People: Capitalism, Welfare and the Making of a Human Catastrophe
 Stella Dadzie, A Kick in the Belly: Women, Slavery and Resistance
 Marcus Gilroy-Ware After the Fact? The Truth About Fake News
 Emma Griffin, Bread Winner: An Intimate History of the Victorian Economy
 Owen Hatherley, Red Metropolis: Socialism and the Government of London
 Dan Hicks, The Brutish Museums: The Benin Bronzes, Colonial Violence and Cultural Restitution
 Olivette Otele, African Europeans: An Untold History
 2022  Florian Grosset, The Chagos Betrayal : How Britain Robbed an Island and Made Its People Disappear
 Koshka Duff et al, Abolishing the Police
 Hsiao-Hung Pai, Ciao Ousmane: The Hidden Exploitation of Italy’s Migrant Workers
 Gargi Bhattacharyya et al, Empire's endgame: Racism and the British State
 Matthew Brown and Rhian E Jones, Paint your town red

References

External links

Awards established in 2012
2012 establishments in the United Kingdom
British non-fiction literary awards
Political book awards